Londell "Tincy" Jamerson (May 14, 1931 – December 9, 1975) was an American Negro league pitcher in the 1940s.

A native of Kansas City, Missouri, Jamerson played in a single game for the Kansas City Monarchs as a 17-year-old in 1948. He died in St. Louis, Missouri in 1975 at age 44.

References

External links
 and Seamheads

1931 births
1975 deaths
Kansas City Monarchs players
20th-century African-American sportspeople